The Washington & Jefferson Presidents football team has represented Washington & Jefferson College in intercollegiate college football competition since 1890.  The team has competed in the National Collegiate Athletic Association (NCAA) Division III since its formation in 1973.  From 1956 to 1972 Washington & Jefferson competed in the NCAA College Division.  In 1958, the Presidents, who had previously been independent and not members of any conference, joined the Presidents' Athletic Conference.

As of the end of the 2009 season, the Presidents have played in 1,057 games during their 119 seasons; during that time they have employed 30 head coaches.  In 1894, E. Gard Edwards became the first paid head coach.  The hiring of professional coaches for the football team was controversial among large portions of the college community, including those who felt it was a poor use of college funds and faculty members who believed that the focus on athletics detracted from the ideal of a scholar-athlete.  Professor Edward Linton represented the college at the 1906 founding of the International Athletic Association of the United States, the forerunner of the NCAA, where the first national standards for edibility and amateurism were developed.  At that meeting, Linton expressed a desire for the student athlete to be "relieved of the incubus of the professional coach."  Three coaches have led Washington & Jefferson College to the NCAA Division III playoffs: John Luckhardt, John Banaszak, and Mike Sirianni. Those three coaches, plus Chuck Ream, coached teams that won the Presidents' Athletic Conference Championship.  Greasy Neale's 1921 team played in the 1922 Rose Bowl, the oldest bowl game, where they tied the heavily favored California Golden Bears.  Neale is the only coach to lead the Presidents to a bowl game appearance.

John Luckhardt is the all-time leader in seasons coached (17), games coached (176), and wins (137).  Current coach Mike Sirianni has the highest winning percentage (.854) of any coach since the 1900s.  During his two years as head coach, Charles Nelson has the worst winning percentage (.031).  Four coaches, Greasy Neale, John Heisman, Andrew Kerr, and Pete Henry have been inducted into the College Football Hall of Fame.  Two of those coaches, Greasy Neale and Pete Henry have been inducted into the Pro Football Hall of Fame.  The current coach is Mike Sirianni, whose first season was in 2003.

Key

Coaches
Updated through 2022 college football season

Notes

References
General
 
 
 
Specific

Lists of college football head coaches

Pennsylvania sports-related lists